A prude (Old French prude meaning honourable woman) is a person who is described as (or would describe themselves as) being concerned with decorum or propriety, significantly in excess of normal prevailing standards. They may be perceived as being more uncomfortable than most with sexuality or nudity.

The name is generally considered a pejorative term to suggest fear and contempt of human sexuality and excessive, unusual modesty stemming from such a negative view of sexuality. It is hence unflattering, often used as an insult. A person with such attitude to sexuality may have reservations about nudity, public display of sexual affection, discussion of sexual matters, participating in romantic or sexual activity—reservations that exceed normal prevailing community standards. Exhibiting fear and discomfort with sexuality may be associated with advocating censorship of sexuality or nudity in the media, avoiding or condemning any public display of affection.

The degree of prudery understood as fearful contempt of human sexuality can vary among different cultures and traditions.

Another use of "prude" is as a label and an insult directed to anybody having reservations resulting from standards of modesty or even any moral standards and beliefs or which are not shared by the offender. Thus one can be labeled a "prude" for expressing reservations about drinking alcohol, or consuming other drugs, or participating in mischief. When prudishness or prudish attitudes are viewed as part of a wider process it is sometimes called prudification.

In this meaning, the term generally has a relative sense. For example, one may be viewed as having relatively lax standards regarding sexuality and drug usage compared to the overall population in which one resides, but compared to a smaller, specific subculture with more permissive standards, one may appear to be unduly strict and thus be labeled a prude when one refuses to participate in more liberal seeming behaviors.

Synonyms of "prude" include: patty da prude, goody-goody (in certain contexts), and Mrs Grundy.

See also 

 Antisexualism
 Christian Right
 Erotophobia
 Feminist Sex Wars
 Fuddy-duddy
 Openness to experience
 Prig
 Promiscuity
 Puritan
 Sexual abstinence
 Social norm
 Stickler
 Victorian morality

References 

Pejorative terms for people